Darren Dods (born 7 June 1975) is a Scottish football player and coach. Dods played as a central defender for Hibernian, St Johnstone, Inverness Caledonian Thistle, Dundee United, Falkirk, Forfar Athletic and Brechin City. He also represented Scotland at the under-21 and B international levels.

Playing career

Edinburgh-born Dods attended Broughton High School. He began his professional career with hometown club Hibernian in 1992, making over seventy first team appearances in a six-year spell. In 1998, Dods moved to St Johnstone where his performances earned him a four-year contract extension in December 2000.

Inverness CT

When his contract expired in the Summer of 2004, he signed a contract at Inverness Caledonian Thistle and won the Caley Thistle fans' Player of the Year award in his first season.

In March 2006, shortly after Craig Brewster left Inverness to become Dundee United manager, Dods was rumoured to be a target for the Tayside club, although he still had over a year left on his contract. In June, it was reported that Dods had failed to agree a new contract, with Brewster – who had failed in a bid to sign Inverness players Ian Black and David Proctor – still heavily linked with the player. At the start of the 2006–07 season, Dods had a transfer request rejected by Inverness manager Charlie Christie with Inverness subsequently rejecting bids from United of £10,000 and then £35,000 for the player.

Dundee United
On 13 January 2007, it was announced Dods had signed a pre-contract agreement to join Dundee United in June 2007, despite Craig Brewster having left the United manager position three months earlier. New manager Craig Levein said he was "pleased" regarding Dods' two-year deal. On 22 June 2007, Dods formally joined the club, signing a two-year contract with Dundee United. In Dods' ninth game in October 2007, he scored his first goal for the club, heading the only goal in a 1–0 home win over Motherwell.

In November 2007, Dods won a cap for the Scotland B team.

Falkirk

On 13 June 2011, Dods signed for Falkirk. He scored his first goal against Brechin City in a Challenge Cup tie on 23 July 2011. Dods scored the goal in April 2012 to win Falkirk their 4th Scottish Challenge Cup, scoring a header in the 2nd minute in a 1–0 victory over Hamilton at Livingston's Almondvale Stadium. Dods signed a one-year contract extension to stay at Falkirk for the 2012/13 season. He missed a number of games at the start of the season due to a recurring injury, but by mid-September had settled back into his normal centre back role. Dods made 33 appearances in season 2012/13, scoring 5 goals, before leaving in the Summer of 2013. Despite being 37 and having begun his coaching badges, Dods said he still had an interest in the playing side of the game.

Forfar Athletic

On 7 July 2013, it was confirmed that Dods had signed for Forfar Athletic.

Managerial career

Brechin City
In June 2015, following the departure of Ray McKinnon to Raith Rovers, Dods was appointed as player/manager of Brechin City in his first managerial role. Dods' first season with the club saw the club remain rooted to the bottom of League One for the majority of the 2015–16 season, winning just 4 of their first twenty-six matches. However, a late burst of form saw the club win 8 of the final ten games, pushing the side clear of the relegation and play-off positions to finish the season in seventh. Dods' second season was in stark contrast to the first, with Brechin remaining in the top four for most of the season 2016–17. Finishing the season in fourth, the club then went on to win promotion to the Scottish Championship for the first time in 11 years, defeating Raith Rovers and Alloa Athletic in the Championship play-offs.

They were relegated straight back to League One as early as March with only four points on the board following defeat by Morton on 24 March 2018. The club finished the season without winning a league match, the first club to do so in 126 years. Dods ended his playing career at the end of the 2017-18 season to focus solely on management. He was sacked by Brechin in October 2018.

Career statistics

Player

Managerial record

Honours and achievements

Player
Dundee United
 Scottish Cup: 2009-10
Falkirk
 Scottish Challenge Cup: 2011–12

Manager
Brechin City
 Scottish Championship play-offs: 2016-17

See also
 List of footballers in Scotland by number of league appearances (500+)

References

External links

1975 births
Living people
Footballers from Edinburgh
Association football central defenders
Scottish footballers
Scottish Premier League players
Scottish Football League players
Hibernian F.C. players
St Johnstone F.C. players
Inverness Caledonian Thistle F.C. players
Dundee United F.C. players
Falkirk F.C. players
Forfar Athletic F.C. players
Brechin City F.C. players
Brechin City F.C. managers
Scotland under-21 international footballers
Scotland B international footballers
Scottish Professional Football League players
Scottish football managers
Scottish Professional Football League managers